James Latham  was an Irish Anglican priest.

Latham was  educated at Trinity College, Dublin. He was ordained in 1828. After curacies in Killoran and Dublin he was Rector of Wexford from 1878 to 1921. He was  Archdeacon of  Ferns from 1897 to 1934.

Notes

Alumni of Trinity College Dublin
Irish Anglicans
Archdeacons of Ferns